Justin McDonald (born 12 December 1969) is an Australian bobsledder. He competed in the two man and the four man events at the 1994 Winter Olympics. After loaning some ballast to the Swedish team, McDonald was awarded with the Pierre de Coubertin medal for sportsmanship.

References

External links
 

1969 births
Living people
Australian male bobsledders
Olympic bobsledders of Australia
Bobsledders at the 1994 Winter Olympics
Sportspeople from Adelaide